"My Father's Eyes" is a song written and performed by Eric Clapton and produced by Clapton and Simon Climie. It was released as a single in 1998 and was featured on the album Pilgrim. It also spent five weeks at number two on the Billboard Hot Adult Contemporary chart. It became a top-five hit in Canada, where it peaked at number two, and reached the top 20 in Austria, Iceland, and Norway. In 1999, it won a Grammy Award for Best Male Pop Vocal Performance.

Clapton performed this track for the first time in 1992 and again in 1996, in both electric and unplugged versions. These versions of the song were completely different from the official single release in 1998. He would later retire the song in 2004, along with "Tears in Heaven", until the 50 Years Further On Up the Road world tour in 2013.

Inspiration and content
Clapton wrote "My Father's Eyes" whilst living in Antigua and Barbuda in 1991. The song was inspired by the fact that Clapton never met his father, Edward Fryer, who died of leukemia in 1985. Describing how he wishes he knew his father, the song also refers to his own son Conor, who died in 1991 at age four after falling from an apartment window. In Eric Clapton: The Autobiography (2010), Clapton wrote: "In [the song] I tried to describe the parallel between looking in the eyes of my son, and the eyes of the father that I never met, through the chain of our blood."

Accolades

Track listing
 "My Father's Eyes"
 "Change the World"
 "Theme from a Movie That Never Happened" (Orchestral)
 "Inside of Me"

Charts

Weekly charts

Year-end charts

Release history

References

1998 singles
1998 songs
Eric Clapton songs
Grammy Award for Best Male Pop Vocal Performance
Reprise Records singles
Songs about fathers
Songs written by Eric Clapton